Atraulia is a town and a Nagar Panchayat in the Azamgarh district within the Indian state of Uttar Pradesh.

Geography 
Atraulia has an average elevation of 81 metres (265 feet). The nearest river is Ghagra, also known as the Saryu river.

It is situated on the main road from Azamgarh to Lucknow.

Demographics
The total population was 19,586 in the 2011 census.

References

Cities and towns in Azamgarh district